Roderick "Derick" Cabrido is a Filipino documentary producer and film maker. He was awarded with the Bronze World Medal at the 2009 New York Television Festival, for the documentary "Pinays for Export", Silver Screen Award at the 2010 New York International Independent Film and Video Festival for the documentary "Tasaday", he also won the 2012 Silver World Medal Award at the New York Festivals for his documentary "Yaman sa Basura" which is also a finalist for the 2011 UNICEF Asia-Pacific Child Rights Awards.

He was born and raised in Tondo, Manila one of the most densely populated areas of land in the world and one of the poorest and most underdeveloped communities in the Philippines. He is a film and documentary producer of such films at Cuchera (2011) and Nuwebe (2013). In 2014 he directed his debut feature film Children's Show. It won Best Editing, Best Sound Design, Canon Best Cinematography and Best Supporting Actor at 2014 Cinemalaya Independent Film Festival. "Children's Show" also won the Special Jury Prize for the Orient Express Category at Fantasporto International Film Festival; it also grabbed Special Jury Award, Best Screenplay for the Fantastic Cinema Festival, Arkansas, Texas and also the Emerging Director Award from the same festival. It was also nominated for "Regard'Or from the concluded Fribourg International Film Festival in Switzerland. Cabrido also won the Best Story Award at the 15th Gawad Tanglaw Awards, Outstanding Achievement-Development Communication Category of the 9th Hildegarde Awards and Emerging Filmmaker Award at Film Society of Little Rock, Arkansas, Texas.

He is also the producer and cinematographer of the film, "Antipo" which premiered at the 2010 Cannes Film Festival Short Film Corner and produced the film "Cuchera", a finalist at the 2011 Cinemalaya Independent Film Festival which premiered at the 2011 Toronto International Film Festival under Discovery Section. Main Competition, 2011 Stockholm International Film Festival, Official Selection, 2011 Belgrade International Film Festival and Official Selection, 2011 Cleveland Film Festival.He also produced Nuwebe (Termitaria), a finalist at the 2013 Cinemalaya Independent Film Festival which won awards from the Queens World Film Festival and Harlem International Film Festival in New York City, Lume International Film Festival in Brazil, Festival Internacional de Cine Puebla in Mexico and Best Director at the 2015 ASEAN International Film Festival and Awards in Sarawak, Malaysia.

He is also one of the Executive Producers of the "Front Row", a documentary program which airs every Monday at GMA Network in the Philippines.

Awards
Cabrido's awards include:  Bronze World Medal at the 2009 New York Television Festival, for the documentary "Pinays for Export", Silver Screen Award at the 2010 New York International Independent Film and Video Festival for the documentary "Tasaday",  2012 Silver World Medal Award at the New York Festivals for his documentary "Yaman sa Basura" which is also a finalist for the 2011 UNICEF Asia-Pacific Child Rights Awards. Special Jury Prize for the Orient Express Category at Fantasporto International Film Festival ; It also grabbed Special Jury Award, Best Screenplay for the Fantastic Cinema Festival, Arkansas, Texas and also the Emerging Director Award from the same festival; Best Story Award at the 15th Gawad Tanglaw Awards and Emerging Filmmaker Award at Film Society of Little Rock, Arkansas, Texas.

Films

"Engkantong Laog sa Mahabang Dapithapon" (Short Film)

"Engkantong Laog sa Mahabang Dapithapon", a short film about organ selling in the Philippines, Official Selection at the 2013 Cannes Film Festival Short Film Corner.

"Cuchera"

Cuchera was Cabrido's first feature film as a producer. It deals with the grim fate of low-rent drug mules and their recruiters. The film was a Finalist at the 7th Cinemalaya Independent Film Festival and it had its International Premiere at the Discovery Section of the 2011 Toronto International Film Festival (TIFF). It was also screened at the Stockholm International Film Festival (Main Competition), Cleveland International Film Festival, Belgrade International Film Festival and Fribourg International Film Festival.

TIFF film programmer Steve Gravestock described it as "One of the most shocking debuts in recent Filipino cinema... Cuchera may turn out to be a watershed in Filipino film history — directly linking the melodramatic ferocity of the politically charged works of veteran directors like Joel Lamangan and Carlos Siguion-Reyna with the more intimate style of what some have dubbed the Filipino New Wave."

Nuwebe

Nuwebe was Cabrido's follow up to the film Cuchera as a producer. It tells the story of one of the youngest mothers in Philippine history. It initially received mixed reviews from local critics but went on to have a successful run in international film festivals. It was also a finalist at the 2013 Cinemalaya Philippine Independent Film Festival. It has been screened at more than twenty international film festivals. It has won several international awards and nominations from the Queens World Film Festival (Best Director) and Harlem International Film Festival (Best Actress) in New York City, Lume International Film Festival (Special Mention) in Brazil and the Festival Internacional de Cine Puebla (Special Mention) in Mexico.

"Children's Show"

"Children's Show was Cabrido's first feature film as a Director. It tells the story of two siblings. Jun and Al lose their mother to suicide after their father leaves her for another woman. The two brothers move in with their grandmother and plug their earnings from semi-legal boxing matches into the family kitty. However, encounters with their heavy-drinking father are even more dangerous. One of these encounters proves devastating for Al, and Jun commits an unspeakable act.

Cabrido uses tension-laden imagery to depict the circumstances that lead people to make momentous decisions. The young filmmaker demonstrates both a keen feel for carefully composed use of setting as well as a rigorous sense of drama.

Television

The Goodbye Girl 
This will be Cabrido's first directorial debut for a TV series. Based from the 2015 novel of the same name the series will release in 2022.

References

External links
http://www.imdb.com/title/tt3887756/
 www.nuwebe.com
 https://web.archive.org/web/20150402150637/http://www.fiff.ch/en/programme-2015/films/by-section.html
GMA Network: Pinays for export.

Filipino television personalities
Living people
People from Tondo, Manila
Year of birth missing (living people)